The Ladakh Marathon is a marathon held in Leh, a town in the Indian Union Territory of Ladakh. The event's primary edition was held in 2012 and its latest edition was deferred to September 2022 due to COVID-19. In 2015 the marathon joined the Association of International Marathons and Distance Races. It is the fifth marathon from India to receive international recognition.

History
The marathon began as an ambitious initiative to encourage the youth living in "hostile weather conditions" following the devastation of the 2010 flash floods. Despite the region being an arid desert, the years leading up to the natural disaster saw more rainfall than the valley was used to.

With the Khardung-La Challenge and the Silk Route Ultra runners going up to the height of 17,618 feet, the Ladakh Marathon claims to be the highest marathon route in the world.

Organisation
The Ladakh Marathon is organised by India's Rimo Expeditions with the support of the Ladakh Autonomous Hill Development Council (LAHDC). The 42 km run of the ninth edition was the qualifying race of series XIII of the Abbott World Marathon Majors Wanda Age Group World Rankings.

With no sponsor at its helm, the Ladakh Marathon is supported by multiple partners, including Timing Technologies, Enerzal and Bisleri. In 2022 the Khardung-La Challenge partnered with Tata Consumer Products' Himalayan with the objective of spreading awareness about the local communities being affected by melting glaciers.

Events

The Ladakh Marathon is divided into the four following categories:
 5 km - Run For Fun: The shortest route of the marathon was created to attract local students as well as amateur runners and tourists. 
 Half Marathon: The 21 km race starts at the NDS stadium on the Leh-Manali highway and passes through Choglamsar village. 
 Full Marathon: The 42 km race starts and ends in Leh town, passing through panoramic scenes via a route across the Indus River. 
  The Khardung La Challenge - Ultra Marathon: The 72 km race was the only ultramarathon of the event until the Silk Route Ultra. The Khardung La Challenge starts in the village of Khardung well before dawn, continues uphill on the way to Khardung La pass at a height of 17,618 ft. The changing altitudes, weather and geography of the race make it the "Mother of all Marathon races".
 The Silk Route Ultra is the newest addition to the Ladakh Marathon. At a distance of 122 km, the Silk Route Ultra also begins at Nubra Valley's Kyagar Village, crosses Khardung La top, then finishes at Leh town.

Participants
In 2012, the first Ladakh Marathon had 1,500 participants. Since then, the number of participants has exponentially increased, with the consecutive editions hosting 2,200 and 3,000 participants respectively. The recent 2018 marathon included close to 6,000 participants from 23 countries.

Acclimatization

The Ladakh Marathon is held at a height of 11,500 to 17,600 ft. Acclimatization is the foremost issue at this height. Altitude sickness can occur at this height due to lack of oxygen. The Ladakh Marathon has a long pre-marathon work-out schedule to train the participants, helping them acclimatizing to the high altitude and hilly conditions. As per the official website of the Ladakh Marathon, athletes participating in 72 km "Khardungla Challenge" should arrive at Leh at least two weeks before marathon day.

Race day photos 
In the last 5 years of Ladakh Marathon & Khardungla Challenge, the organizers continued the partnership with marathon photography experts SplitSecondPix to provide photo technology for the event. A team of 25 photographers venture out into the extreme terrains of Ladakh to capture the action of the ultra marathon. Starting at 3am in Khardong village and temperatures of −10 °C to 17586 ft Khardung La pass and descending into the Leh Valley the photographers capture the timeless moments through its lenses. Participants can visit the event website or SplitSecondPix website to find these timeless photos on basis of their Bib number.

Winners

The Khardung La Challenge (72 km)
Winners of 72 km "The Khardung La Challenge" also known as "Ultra-Marathon" are as follows.

Since 2015, special 72 km  Khardung La Challenge for women was started.

Women Khardung La Challenge 72 km winner

Marathon 42 km (Women)

Marathon 42 km (Men)

See also
 Chogyal

References

Marathons in India
Sport in Jammu and Kashmir
Tourism in Ladakh
Sport in Ladakh
Recurring sporting events established in 2012
2012 establishments in Jammu and Kashmir